Vyhne is a village in the Žiar nad Hronom District, which is part of the Banská Bystrica Region in central Slovakia.

Geography
Vyhne is located in the Štiavnické vrchy mountains, near the historic town of Banská Štiavnica. A nature reserve called Kamenné more ("Rocky Sea") lies near the village It lies at an altitude of 350 metres and covers an area of 18.34 km².

History
Vyhne was first mentioned in 1256. The oldest still working brewery in Slovakia was founded there by the Knights Templar in 1473.
During WWII, several hundred of Jews worked in the Vyhne labor camp.

Demographics
In 2004, the village had a population of 1,341. According to the census in 2001, 98.2% of inhabitants were Slovaks. The Roman Catholicism is the most popular religion (79%), but there is also a significant number of atheists (12.7%) living in the village.

Spa
The spa using the hot springs in Vyhne is dated to the 14th century. Developed by the capital from the nearby affluent city of Banská Štiavnica, it has attracted many famous visitors, such as Prince Francis II Rákóczi and writer Mór Jókai. The spa was devastated by World War II. A water park called the Water Paradise (Vodný raj) is operating since June 2007.

References

External links
 Official website of Vyhne 

Villages and municipalities in Žiar nad Hronom District